Blackbird Lennon-McCartney Icons is the first studio album by American singers Marilyn McCoo and Billy Davis Jr. in over 35 years. It was released on April 30, 2021, and is the first album released under business mogul Kathy Ireland's new record label EE1 in partnership with international music company BMG. Davis credits Ireland and producer Nic Mendoza for bringing the project to life. The duo also felt encouraged to get in a studio due to concerns in the country and similar divisions experienced in the 60s. The duo said it was a civil rights movement which became a human rights movement with a goal to encourage people to come together during trying times. During an interview about the album in On June 29, 2021 Questlove called Marilyn McCoo & Billy Davis Jr "the first couple of Pop and Soul." They would later appear in Quest's directorial debut, Summer of Soul. During Questlove's acceptance speech for his Oscar as best documentary feature, he called McCoo heart of the film.

Singles
The album's lead single, "Blackbird", was released on April 19, 2021. Davis thanked Mendoza and Questlove for their involvement. "We thank Questlove, EE1, BMG and our Producer, Nic Mendoza, for giving us a platform at this age, to use our artistry as part of the activism we’ve always practiced." The was based on people, "Blackbird, fly ... even when the bodies of our babies are shot down or choked to death … their spirits continue to fight to equality. Those of us that are still here in the nest of life will continue this peaceful war for justice."

Chart

Release history

References

2021 albums
BMG Rights Management albums